The Carbuncle Cup was an architecture prize, given annually by the magazine Building Design to "the ugliest building in the United Kingdom completed in the last 12 months". It was intended to be a humorous response to the prestigious Stirling Prize, given by the Royal Institute of British Architects.

The cup was launched in 2006, with the first winner being Drake Circus Shopping Centre in Plymouth by Chapman Taylor. A shortlist was announced by the periodical each year, based on nominations from the public, and usually in the same week as the Stirling Prize shortlist. Free voting via the magazine's website was at first used to select the winner. From 2009 onwards, a small group of critics selected the winner.

The award was inspired by the Carbuncle Awards that Scottish architecture magazine Urban Realm, formerly Prospect, had been presenting to buildings and areas in Scotland since 2000.

The name derives from a comment in 1984 by the then Prince of Wales Charles III, an opponent of certain modernist styles and forms and a staunch defender of existing characterisations, themes and points of interest, who described Ahrends, Burton and Koralek's proposed extension of London's National Gallery as a "monstrous carbuncle on the face of a much-loved and elegant friend".

The event was last held in 2018.

Winners and nominees

See also 
List of architecture awards

References 

Architecture awards
Ironic and humorous awards
Architecture in the United Kingdom
Awards established in 2006
2006 establishments in the United Kingdom
Awards disestablished in 2018
2018 disestablishments in the United Kingdom